Chrysocraspeda tristicula is a moth of the family Geometridae first described by Swinhoe in 1885. It is found in Sri Lanka. India, Myanmar, Borneo, Philippines and Sumbawa.

Pale greyish banded on fawn of wings. A broad marginal band found on both wings, which is interrupted by fawn bands.

References

Moths of Asia
Moths described in 1885